Munt Arlas (3,127 m) is a mountain in the Bernina Range of the Alps, overlooking Lake Silvaplana in the Swiss canton of Graubünden. It lies south of Piz Surlej, on the range between the main Inn valley and the Val Roseg.

References

External links
 Munt Arlas on Hikr

Bernina Range
Mountains of Graubünden
Mountains of the Alps
Mountains of Switzerland